Sanath de Silva (born 5 February 1989) is a Sri Lankan cricketer. He has played ten first-class and two List A matches for Chilaw Marians Cricket Club between 2011 and 2013. He made his first-class debut for Chilaw Marians Cricket Club in the 2011–12 Premier Trophy on 27 January 2012.

See also
 List of Chilaw Marians Cricket Club players

References

External links
 

1989 births
Living people
Sri Lankan cricketers
Chilaw Marians Cricket Club cricketers
Place of birth missing (living people)